Ek Daav Bhatacha is a Marathi play directed by Sachin Goswami. The cast includes Vrushali Gandhi, Bhushan Kadu, Shraddha Ketkar, Vaibhav Mangle and Vishakha Subhedar.

Synopsis
The daughter of a bank clerk and his wife who is a devotee of Anna Maharaj is married to an auto rickshaw driver.

The driver is always irritated with one lady who usually starts her day by selling vada's near his house. His love for meat and his request to the lady selling vada to bring by hot, spicy chicken will create misunderstandings.

Cast
 Vrushali Gandhi
 Bhushan Kadu
 Shraddha Ketkar
 Vaibhav Mangle
 Vishakha Subhedar

Crew
Director - Sachin Goswami.
Writer - Sachin Mote

References

External links
 
 

Indian plays
Postmodern plays
Marathi-language plays